Gordon Amos (4 April 1905 – 7 April 1995) was an Australian cricketer. He played twenty-five first-class matches for New South Wales and Queensland between 1926/27 and 1936/37.

See also
 List of New South Wales representative cricketers

References

External links
 

1905 births
1995 deaths
Australian cricketers
New South Wales cricketers
Queensland cricketers
Cricketers from Sydney